The 1999–2000 ECHL season was the 12th season of the ECHL. Before the start of the season, the Miami Matadors and Columbus Chill suspended operations, the Chesapeake Icebreakers, who originally suspended operations, moved to Jackson, Mississippi. The league also welcomed expansion franchises in North Little Rock, Arkansas and Trenton, New Jersey, as well as welcoming back a franchise in the former market of Greensboro, North Carolina. The New Orleans Brass moved into the New New Orleans Arena. The league also created a new individual award, the Plus Performer Award, to be awarded to the player who leads the league in plus-minus rating at the end of the regular season. The Florida Everblades finished first overall in the regular season, winning the Brabham Cup and the Peoria Rivermen won their first Kelly Cup, defeating the Louisiana IceGators four games to two.

Regular season

Final standings 
Note: GP = Games played; W = Wins; L= Losses; T = Ties; GF = Goals for; GA = Goals against; Pts = Points; Green shade = Clinched playoff spot; Blue shade = Clinched division; (z) = Clinched home-ice advantage

Northern Conference

Southern Conference

Kelly Cup playoffs

Northern Conference

Bracket

Quarterfinals

Semifinals

Finals

Southern Conference

Bracket

Wild Card

Quarterfinals

Semifinals

Finals

Kelly Cup finals

ECHL awards

See also 
 ECHL
 ECHL All-Star Game
 Kelly Cup
 List of ECHL seasons

References 

ECHL seasons
ECHL season, 1999-2000